Tellegen is a surname. Notable people with the surname include:

 Auke Tellegen, US psychologist of the personality
 Bernard D. H. Tellegen, Dutch electrical engineer
 Frits Tellegen (1919–2020), Dutch urban designer
 Jan Willem Tellegen (1859–1921), Dutch politician
 Lou Tellegen, Dutch American silent film and stage actor, director, and screenwriter
 Ockje Tellegen, Dutch politician
 Toon Tellegen, Dutch children's writer and poet

See also
 Tellegen's theorem, a theorem in netwerk theory, developed by Bernard D. H. Tellegen

Dutch-language surnames